Doldersum is a hamlet in the Dutch province of Drenthe. It is a part of the municipality of Westerveld, and lies about 24 km northwest of Hoogeveen.

It was first mentioned in 1402 as Doldersem. The etymology is unknown.

On 7 to 8 September 1944, 21 young men escaped from a forced labour camp in Vledder. The resistance hid them in the forest of Doldersum. One of the hiding places was discovered, and seven were shot. One survived, but remained handicapped. A monument has been placed on the heath in their honour.

References

Populated places in Drenthe
Westerveld